Nataxa is a genus of moths of the family Anthelidae. The genus was erected by Francis Walker in 1855.

Species
 Nataxa amblopis (Turner, 1944)
 Nataxa flavescens (Walker, 1855)

References

Anthelidae
Moth genera